Jean-Efflam Bavouzet (born 17 October 1962) is a French classical pianist.

Education
Bavouzet was born in Lannion, France and grew up in Metz. He started his music studies there, encountering successful composers including Iannis Xenakis, Olivier Messiaen, Karlheinz Stockhausen and Pierre Boulez.  Moving to the Conservatoire de Paris, he studied under Pierre Sancan, among others. He also had private lessons with Georg Solti, and in June 1997 was engaged to play Béla Bartók's Piano Concerto No. 3 with Solti conducting the Orchestre de Paris in 1998. Solti died in September 1997, so they never appeared together in public.

Bavouzet won first prize in the Beethoven International Piano Competition in Cologne in 1986.

Recordings
Bavouzet is a recording artist for the Chandos label. His recordings have received several Gramophone Awards (2014, Prokofiev piano concertos; 2011, works for piano and orchestra by Debussy and Ravel; 2009, Debussy Complete Solo Piano Music, vol. 4), and numerous other awards, including the BBC Music Magazine Award, the Choc de la Musique and the Diapason d'Or.

His discography includes:

 Joseph Haydn: piano sonatas (9 volumes)
 Ludwig van Beethoven: sonatas (3 volumes)
 Gabriel Pierné: concerto
 Béla Bartók: concertos
 Maurice Ravel: concertos; complete piano works
 Claude Debussy: complete piano works, Fantaisie for piano and orchestra
 Franz Liszt: recital
 Wolfgang Amadeus Mozart: concertos

References

External links
 

1962 births
21st-century French male classical pianists
Conservatoire de Paris alumni
Living people
People from Lannion